The red-headed poison frog (Ranitomeya fantastica)  is a species of frog in the family Dendrobatidae. It is endemic to Peru and found in the northern San Martín and Loreto Regions.

Its natural habitats are primary and older secondary growth wet forests. The species uses phytotelmata for breeding, which must be present in its habitat. Females lay 2–6 eggs which male then guards.

The species is threatened by collection for international pet trade as well as habitat loss.

References

Ranitomeya
Amphibians described in 1884
Amphibians of Peru
Endemic fauna of Peru
Taxonomy articles created by Polbot